Diamond Veil is the eighth studio album by Sweetbox with Jamie Pineda's second studio album. It was released on May 25, 2011, in Japan, and on June 3, 2011, in Korea. It includes 15 new songs written by Jamie Pineda, Sebastian Thott and many others. The Korean and Japanese releases contains all 15 songs, with Japan's version including 2 extra bonus tracks. The album was also released digitally via iTunes and Amazon on May 18, 2011.

Track listing

Credits
A&r – Hayden Bell 
Backing Vocals – Alina Devecerski (tracks: 1, 5, 9 - 11) 
Edited By [Vocals] – Carl Bjorsell (tracks: 1, 2), Didrik Thott (tracks: 3, 4, 6), Sebastian Thott 
Executive Producer – Hayden Bell, Heiko Schmidt 
Mastered By – Bjorn Engelman
Mixed By – Bart Ullared Jonsson 
Producer, Arranged By, Programmed By, Instruments – Sebastian Thott 
Recorded By [Vocals] – Christian Fast (tracks: 14), Erik Lewander (tracks: 7, 8), Henrik Nordenback (tracks: 14), Sebastian Thott 
Vocals – Jamie Pineda

Samples
"Bullet Proof" samples 'Bolero' from Maurice Ravel
"Everything's Gonna Be Alright" samples 'Air on a G String (Suite No.3)' from J.S Bach
"I Know You're Not Alone" samples 'Spring from The Four Seasons' from Vivaldi 
"Minute By Minute" samples 'Morning from Peer Gynt Suite' from Grieg
"Under The Influence" 'Concerto For Piano And Orchestra No.1' from Tchaikovsky

References

Sweetbox albums
2011 albums